Agriophara salinaria is a moth in the family Depressariidae. It was described by Edward Meyrick in 1931. It is found on the Solomon Islands.

References

Moths described in 1931
Agriophara
Moths of Oceania